Pennie Ann Trumbull (born July 3, 1954), also known as Pennie Lane, is an American socialite, philanthropist, businesswoman, and entrepreneur. During the 1970s she formed the group The Flying Garter Girls, which traveled around the country as groupies for famous rock bands. Her time as a groupie was chronicled in the 2000 film Almost Famous and its 2019 stage musical adaptation. She was also portrayed by actress Kate Hudson in the film and Solea Pfeiffer in the musical.

Biography

Early life
Trumbull was born and raised in Portland, Oregon. She was an only child and attended Roosevelt High School, where she was an award-winning equestrian and tried out for the Olympic team. Her love of music began at an early age, and she started attending concerts at 16. She moved to Los Angeles when she was 18 with a touring musician who was in a rock band, Steppenwolf, and returned to Portland a few months later.

The Flying Garter Girls
In the early 1970s, she became immersed in the rock music scene. She and four other girls decided to form a group and began pursuing bands. They each gave themselves nicknames, and Trumbull chose the name Pennie Lane in part from the song by the Beatles. The other girls in the group were Marvelous Meg, Sexy Sandy, The Real Camille, Miss Julia, and Caroline Can-Can. The girls had matchbooks made with The Flying Garter Girls printed on them to promote themselves, and quickly became successful and slept with countless rock bands over a period of three years, after which the girls left the rock music world behind them.

Later life
Trumbull lived in San Diego for many years. She obtained her bachelor's degree in Business Administration from Cal State Northridge, where she was a competitive fencer, and an MBA in Marketing from Alliant International University in 1988. She owned her own marketing firm for a time. Upon her divorce in the early 1990s, she moved back home to be closer to her parents. She bought property on Sauvie Island, Oregon  and built a ranch, which she describes as a "Rock n Roll Ranch". Lane owns her own wine label named Swallows and grows her own Pinot noir grapes. She continues to be involved in the music scene in the Portland area. Trumbull is an ordained minister and officiates weddings at her ranch.

She is a longtime member of the Sauvie Island Grange Association and various other community organizations.

Portrayals in media
Her friend, film director Cameron Crowe, asked for her permission to use her name and likeness in a feature film he was creating. Crowe used her as a consultant on the film. Trumbull was hesitant about losing her privacy, but Crowe insisted that the character be named Penny Lane and agreed to change the spelling from Trumbull to Trumble. Crowe and Trumbull had met in the 1970s while Crowe was working as a journalist covering rock music for Rolling Stone, and he wanted to create a film about that time period. When Crowe suggested that actress Kate Hudson be cast as Pennie, she was initially reluctant, but later agreed that she was the right choice. Hudson was nominated for the Academy Award for Best Supporting Actress and won the Golden Globe Award for her performance as Penny Lane. In 2019, the film was adapted by Crowe into a stage musical, in which Solea Pfeiffer played Penny Lane.

In 2012, Trumbull was the special guest at the San Diego Film Festival, which featured a special screening of Almost Famous. She continues to make appearances discussing the film and her life in the 1970s.

References

1954 births
Living people
American socialites
Philanthropists from Oregon
American women in business
Businesspeople from Portland, Oregon
California State University, Northridge alumni
American marketing businesspeople
Roosevelt High School (Oregon) alumni
21st-century American women